Vrushika Mehta is an Indian actress and professional dancer who mainly works in Hindi television. She made her acting debut with Aasman Se Aage portraying Vrushika in 2012. Mehta is best known for her portrayal of Sharon Rai Prakash in Dil Dosti Dance, Asmita "Puchki" Mazumdar in Yeh Teri Galiyan and Dr. Riddhima Saxena in Yeh Rishta Kya Kehlata Hai.

Early life
Mehta was born in Ahmedabad and brought up in Mumbai. She completed her graduation from Tolani College of Commerce, Mumbai. Mehta is a professional dancer.

Career
Mehta made her acting debut in 2012 with Aasman Se Aage portraying Vrushika. She portrayed Sharon Rai Prakash from 2013 to 2015 in Dil Dosti Dance opposite Shantanu Maheshwari. It proved as a major turning point in her career.

Next, she appeared in Yeh Hai Aashiqui. In 2015, she was a part of episodics like Zing's Pyaar Tune Kya Kiya and Zee TV's Fear Files.

In 2015, she played Amrita Prasad in Twist Wala Love opposite Rohan Gandotra. Next, she played Kaira in Satrangi Sasural opposite Ravish Desai. In 2016, she hosted Desi Explorers Jordan on YouTube.

In 2016, she played Ishana in Ishqbaaaz opposite Kunal Jaisingh.

Next, she made her digital debut as Tamanna in Viu's Truth or Tamanna. From 2018 to 2020, she portrayed Asmita "Puchki" Kumari in Zee TV's Yeh Teri Galiyan opposite Avinash Mishra and received further success.

From 30 November 2020 to 22 December 2020, she played Dr. 
Riddhima Saxena in StarPlus's Yeh Rishta Kya Kehlata Hai opposite Mohsin Khan.

Filmography

Television

Web series

Music videos

Awards and nominations

References

External links

Indian television actresses
Living people
1994 births